Alfred Homer, Jr. was an English professional football manager.

Homer was born in Birmingham. He became Bristol Rovers' first full-time manager-secretary in 1899, a job he held for twenty-one years until 1920. Prior to this he was assistant secretary of Aston Villa.

Homer's father, also called Alfred Homer, founded the Vulcan Brewery in Aston, Birmingham, in 1878. The business was later sold in 1899 to Mitchells & Butlers, before the brewery site was sold to HP Foods for an HP Sauce factory.

References

External links

Year of birth missing
Year of death missing
English football managers
Bristol Rovers F.C. managers